Kalbographa lueckingii is a species of corticolous (bark-dwelling), crustose lichen in the family Graphidaceae. Found in southeastern Brazil, it was formally described as a new species in 2009 by Klaus Kalb. It is only known from the type collection. The species epithet honours lichenologist Robert Lücking, "for his outstanding contributions to tropical lichenology".

The lichen has a smooth, pale olive-green thallus. It contains stictic acid as a major lichen product, and minor amounts of constictic acid.

References

Graphidaceae
Lichen species
Lichens described in 2009
Lichens of Southeast Brazil
Taxa named by Klaus Kalb